Silvan Aegerter (born 5 May 1980,) is a former Swiss football midfielder.

Club career
Before he played for FC Thun and FC Zürich. He played in the youth team for his local team FC Grenchen and also for FC Basel.

For FC Thun Aegerter played in the Champions League and the UEFA Cup. He was released by FC Thun in spring 2007 and a few days later signed a contract with FC Zurich until 20 June 2010, his latest contract was until 2012.

References

External links
 FC Zurich profile 

1980 births
Sportspeople from the canton of Solothurn
Living people
Swiss men's footballers
Association football midfielders
FC Zürich players
FC Thun players
FC Basel players
FC Lugano players
Swiss Super League players
Swiss Challenge League players
FC Münsingen players